Mark Ragins is an American psychiatrist in the recovery movement in mental health care.

Biography
He is a founding member of the Village ISA, where his work with people with severe mental illness led him to become one of the leading voices in recovery-based treatment theory.  He is the author of numerous writings on recovery-based mental health care and reforming mental health systems to provide recovery-based care.  His full-length book, Road to Recovery is available for free online.

He is a frequent lecturer and consultant nationally and internationally as well as a trainer for psychiatric residents through the University of Southern California's psychiatry residency. He was the co-recipient of the American Psychiatric Association’s 1995 van Ameringen Award for his outstanding contribution to the field of psychiatric rehabilitation and was named a Distinguished Fellow of the American Psychiatric Association in 2006 for his continuing work in recovery-based mental health care. Additionally, he received the US Psychiatric Rehabilitation Association's John Beard Lifetime achievement award in 2011.

Ragins appears as a character in the book The Soloist by Steve Lopez, which was released in a movie version in 2009.

References

American psychiatrists
Living people
Year of birth missing (living people)